"Dandelion" is a song by the English rock band the Rolling Stones, written by Mick Jagger and Keith Richards, and first released as a B-side to "We Love You" in August 1967. John Lennon and Paul McCartney sing backing vocals.
Billboard described the single as "an easy beat rocker with good story line."

Background
The song has lyrical references to British counting or nursery rhymes. The first demo version of "Dandelion" was recorded in November 1966.  Originally titled "Sometimes Happy, Sometimes Blue", it had different lyrics and was sung and played by Keith Richards. On the released version, Mick Jagger sings the lead vocal.

The recording's arrangement makes use of baroque instrumentation; Brian Jones contributed a distinctive melodic figure played on Mellotron, while Nicky Hopkins performed on harpsichord. The two parts move in contrary motion, with Jones' melody ascending against Hopkins' descending pedal point. The song is in the key of B-flat major and in the 4/4 time signature.

The Rolling Stones have never performed "Dandelion" live; nonetheless it has been included on several compilations, including Through the Past, Darkly (Big Hits Vol. 2), More Hot Rocks (Big Hits & Fazed Cookies), Singles Collection: The London Years, and Rolled Gold+: The Very Best of the Rolling Stones.

The original single release fades out with a brief section of the Nicky Hopkins piano intro from the A-side, "We Love You". The coda is missing on most versions of "Dandelion" appearing on compilation albums, which include the song in a 3:32 edit, but it may be heard, for example, in the 3:48 version included on Singles Collection: The London Years and Through The Past, Darkly.

Personnel
According to authors Philippe Margotin and Jean-Michel Guesdon, except where noted:

The Rolling Stones
 Mick Jagger vocals, maracas
 Keith Richards backing vocals, acoustic guitar
 Brian Jones Mellotron, saxophone
 Bill Wyman bass
 Charlie Watts drums

Additional personnel
 Nicky Hopkins harpsichord
 John Lennon backing vocals
 Paul McCartney backing vocals

Charts
"Dandelion" reached number eight on the UK Singles Chart and number 14 on the US Billboard 100 singles chart.

References

Sources

 
 

The Rolling Stones songs
1967 songs
Decca Records singles
London Records singles
Psychedelic pop songs
Songs written by Jagger–Richards
Song recordings produced by Andrew Loog Oldham